The music articles in the Rees's Cyclopaedia were written by Charles Burney (1726–1814), with additional material by John Farey Sr (1766–1826), and John Farey Jr (1791–1851).The Cyclopædia was illustrated using 53 plates as well as a numerous examples of music typset within the articles.

The general musical articles list all those that are not biographical, which form a separate list. They were written mostly by Charles Burney. Others on the scientific basis of music were by John Farey Sr, and technical descriptions of some musical instruments were given by his son.

It had been Burney's intention to write a Dictionary of Music, but for various reasons he never did so. In 1801 when he was aged 75 he was offered the chance of writing music articles in Rees's Cyclopaedia, and this occupied him to around 1805 or '06. His fee was £1000. Burney's brief was to 'include definitions in all the languages of Europe where Music has been much cultivated, with its history, biography, Criticism and discussions'

The articles contain an enormous amount of musical information, much of which being augmented versions of what he had already published in his earlier writings  In addition, he took the opportunity to add new topics covering the years of the last quarter of the eighteenth century and much of the first decade of the nineteenth, in particular the London musical scene. In all he wrote 996 general articles. While the majority of the articles have some length, a good proportion are brief (3 or 4 lines or fewer), dictionary definitions, or cross references. Many of the former are terms derived from French and Italian. The encyclopaedic-length articles (as distinct from the dictionary-length articles) are usually longer than Burney's earlier published writings on the same topic.

Dr Percy Scholes cites a statement by Dr Rees from Preface to the Cyclopaedia that he had 'constantly interpolated his own additions to the articles of his specialists'. and quotes a passage from the article about Dance (Vol 11) describing 'in our own memory', Welsh church-goers being played out of church by a fiddle.

John Farey, sr was by profession a geologist, but was greatly interested music. He was involved with the Choral Fund, the Cecilian Society and the  Surrey Chapel Society, and also sang in oratorios in Drury Lane Theatre. He was particularly interested in the mathematics of music and temperament, and wrote all the 215 scientific articles on these topics for Rees. Farey's investigations of temperament involved discussing (and criticising) the various schemes in use then. He described them in a series of letters to the Philosophical Magazine, and the Monthly Magazine as well as the American Journal of Science. He also contributed 25 articles to the Edinburgh Encyclopædia on this topic .

John Farey, jr was a prolific contributor to Rees's Cyclopaedia, not only as a writer but also as an artist of many of the plates. For the four articles he wrote, he drew plates for two illustrating John Isaac Hawkins's Finger-keyed Viol, and two different patterns of pipe organ. The plates were keyed to the texts of the articles, and for this reason it was necessary for Farey to have produced both, since writing the texts describing the plates would have required technical knowledge which Burney would not have possessed.

Alphabetisation of articles:
The work followed the common practice of conflating the letters I and J and U and V into single sequences. The topics included in this list therefore follow the sequence they appear in the original volumes.

Annotations:
The articles are annotated to Mercer's edition of Burney's History (1935) and Scholes's edition of Burney's travels, Travels (1959). Where a page reference is given the text can be found there. Where a book is cited, but with no page, index entries were found, and Burney is presumed to have written his article using the information there. Where there is no annotation, the article must be unique to the Cyclopaedia.

Vol 1 A-Amarathides

Vol 2 Amarantus-Arteriotomy

Vol 3 Artery-Battersea

Vol 4 Battery-Bookbinding

Vol 5 Book-keeping-Calvart

Vol 6 Calvary-Castra

Vol 7 Castramentation-Chronology

Vol 8 Chronometer-Colliseum

Vol 9 Collision-Corne

Vol 10 Cornea-Czyrcassy

Vol 11 D-Dissimilitude

Vol 12 Dissimulation-Eloane

Vol 13 Elocution-Extremities

Vol 14 Extrinsic-Food (part)

Vol 15 Food(part)-Generation (part)

Vol 16 Generation (part)- Gretna

Vol 17 Gretry-Hebe

Vol 18 Hibiscus-Increment

Vol 19 Increments-Kilmes

Vol 20 Kiln-Light

Vol 21 Lighthouse-Machinery (part)

Vol 22 Machinery(part)-Mattheson

Vol 23 Matthew-Monsoon

Vol 24 Monster – Newton-in-the-Willows

Vol 25 Newtonian Philosophy-Ozunusze

Vol 26 P-Perturbation

Vol 27 Pertussis-Poetics

Vol 28 Poetry-Punjoor

Vol 29 Punishment-Repton

Vol 30 Republic-Rzemien

Vol 31 S-Scotium

Vol 32 Scotland-Sindy

Vol 33 Sines-Starboard

Vol 34 Starch-Szydlow

Vol 35 T-Toleration

Vol 36 Tol-Ver

Vol 37 Vermes-Waterloo

Vol 38 Water-Wzetin

Vol 39 X-Zytomiers with Addenda

References

Music-related lists
General music